Huntingdon is a provincial electoral district in the Montérégie region of Quebec, Canada that elects members to the National Assembly of Quebec.  It notably includes the municipalities of Sainte-Martine, Napierville, Ormstown, Saint-Michel, Saint-Anicet, Lacolle and Sainte-Clotilde.

It was originally created for the 1867 election.  Its final election was in 1989 and its successor electoral district was Beauharnois-Huntingdon.

It was re-created for the 2003 election from parts of Beauharnois-Huntingdon and Saint-Jean electoral districts.

In the change from the 2001 to the 2011 electoral map, it lost Saint-Rémi to the newly created Sanguinet electoral district.

Members of the Legislative Assembly / National Assembly

Election results

|-
 
|Liberal
|Stéphane Billette
|align="right"|11178
|align="right"|44.01
|align="right"|

|}

|-
 
|Liberal
|André Chenail
|align="right"|9883
|align="right"|31.45
|align="right"|-21.08

|-

|Independent
|Jean Siouville
|align="right"|295
|align="right"|0.94
|align="right"|
|}

|-
 
|Liberal
|André Chenail
|align="right"|15512
|align="right"|52.53
|align="right"|

|-

|}

References

External links
Information
 Elections Quebec

Election results
 Election results (National Assembly)
 Election results (Elections Quebec)

Maps
 2011 map (PDF)
 2001 map (Flash)
2001–2011 changes (Flash)
1992–2001 changes (Flash)
 Electoral map of Montérégie region
 Quebec electoral map, 2011

Huntingdon